A red letter day (sometimes hyphenated as red-letter day or called scarlet day in academia) is any day of special significance or opportunity.
Its roots are in classical antiquity; for instance, important days are indicated in red in a calendar dating from the Roman Republic (509–27 BC). 

In medieval manuscripts, initial capitals and highlighted words (known as rubrics) were written in red ink. The practice was continued after the invention of the printing press, including in Catholic liturgical books. Many calendars still indicate special dates, festivals and holidays in red instead of black.

In the universities of the UK, scarlet days are when doctors may wear their scarlet 'festal' or full dress gowns instead of their undress ('black') gown.

In Norway, Sweden, Hong Kong, South Korea, Indonesia and some Latin American countries, a public holiday is sometimes referred to as "red day" (rød dag, röd dag, 빨간 날, 紅日, tanggal merah), as it is printed in red in calendars.

Legal

On red letter days, judges of the English High Court (King's Bench Division) wear, at sittings of the Court of Law, their scarlet robes (see court dress). Red letter days for these purposes are a fixed selection of saints' days (sometimes coinciding with the traditional start or end dates of the legal terms during which sittings of the High Court take place) and of national celebrations, mostly associated with senior members of the British royal family (and, therefore, changing from generation to generation).

Current red letter days in the United Kingdom

The list of red letter days currently observed in the United Kingdom (and on which, if a weekday, judges of the English High Court (King's Bench Division) traditionally wear, at sittings of the Court of Law, their scarlet robes) is as follows:

October
 18th (St Luke)
 28th (St Simon and St Jude)
November
 1st (All Saints)
 14th (King Charles III, born, 1948)
 2nd Saturday in November (Lord Mayor's Day)
 30th (St Andrew)
December
 21st (St Thomas)
January
 25th (Conversion of St Paul)
February
 2nd (Candlemas) 
 6th (Queen's Accession, 1952)
 Moveable (Ash Wednesday)
 24th (St Mathias)
March
 1st (St David)
 25th (Lady Day) 
April
 21st (Queen Elizabeth II born, 1926)
 25th (St Mark)
May
 1st (St Philip and St James)
 Moveable (Ascension Day)
June
 2nd (Coronation of Queen Elizabeth II, 1953)
 2nd Saturday in June (Queen's Official Birthday)
 10th (Duke of Edinburgh born, 1921)
 11th (St Barnabas)
 24th (St John the Baptist)
 29th (St Peter)
July
 25th (St James)

Days which will never fall within the legal term are not red letter days (examples being Christmas Day and Easter Day).

Former red letter days in the United Kingdom

A comparison can be drawn with the Red Letter Days listed 100 years ago in Dress and Insignia Worn at His Majesty's Court (1921), which are on the same principle (a fixed selection of saints’ days, plus days honouring senior members of the Royal Family), except that the modern list adds the national saints of Wales and Scotland (St David and St Andrew, not listed in 1921) although not the national saint of England (St George). The 1921 listing, in full, is:

Red Letter Days on which the Judges of the High Court (King's Bench Division) wear, at Sittings of the Court of Law, their Scarlet Robes:
 January 25. (Conversion of Saint Paul.)
 February 2. (Purification of the Blessed Virgin Mary.)
 February 24. (Saint Matthias.)
 Ash Wednesday. (Movable.)
 March 25. (Annunciation of the Blessed Virgin Mary.)
 April 25. (Saint Mark.)
 May 1. (Saint Philip and Saint James.)
 Ascension Day. (Holy Thursday.) (Movable.)
 May 6. (The King's Accession.)
 May 26. (The Queen's Birthday.)
 June 3. (The King's Birthday.)
 June 11. (Saint Barnabas.)
 June 22. (The King's Coronation.)
 June 23. (Prince of Wales's Birthday.)
 June 24. (Saint John the Baptist.)
 June 29. Saint Peter.
 Celebration of His Majesty's Birthday. (Movable.)
 June 25. (Saint James.)
 October 18. (Saint Luke.)
 October 28. (Saint Simon and Saint Jude.)
 November 1. (All Saints.)
 November 9. (Lord Mayor's Day.)
 November 30. (Saint Andrew.)
 December 1. (Birthday of Queen Alexandra.)
 December 21. (Saint Thomas.)

See also
 Red envelope - giving a gift in a red envelope, associated with certain dates or events in East Asian cultures

References

Color in culture
Color symbols
Holidays